The majority of major local or national political parties in Europe have aligned themselves into one of the pan-European political organizations.

13 of these pan-European organizations have been legally recognized by the European Union as political parties at the European level:

, there are 10 registered Europarties

History
In October 2014, the regulation (EU, EURATOM) No 1141/2014 of the European Parliament and of the Council on the statute and funding of European political parties and European political foundations lays down the conditions governing the statute and funding of political parties at European level ('European political parties') and political foundations at European level ('European political foundations'). Chapters of this regulations focus on status, funding, control and sanctions.

Political parties in Europe

The Nordic Green Left Alliance is a transnational federation of parties, not a pan-European political party per se, but it articulates a broadly uniform ideology and its membership is exclusive to it.  As such, it is treated akin to one here.

Parties represented in national parliaments or the European Parliament are generally included in the below chart, while independents have been omitted. Great ideological diversity can be found in most pan-European organizations, and individual country rows may not correspond with the heuristic left-right spectrum commonly used within its own political discourse.

 Standalone parties with representation in the European Parliament are coloured by the parliamentary group in which they sit.  These are:
{|
| width="80" style="background: #ddddff"| EPP
| width="80" style="background: #ffdddd"| S&D (PES)
| width="80" style="background: #ffffdd"| RE
| width="80" style="background: #ffc0cb"| GUE/NGL
| width="80" style="background: #ddffdd"| Greens-EFA
| width="80" style="background: #bbccee"| ECR
| width="80" style="background: #aaaaff"| ID
| width="80" style="background: #dcdcdc"| Non-Inscrits
|}

 Standalone parties with representation in the Parliamentary Assembly of the Council of Europe (but not the European Parliament) are coloured by the parliamentary group in which they sit in the former.  These are:
{|
| width="80" style="background: #ddddff"| EPP
| width="80" style="background: #ffdddd"| PES
| width="80" style="background: #ffffdd"| ALDE
|-
| style="background: #bbccee"| ECG
| style="background: #ffc0cb"| EUL
| style="background: #dcdcdc"| Non-Attached
|}

 The "Standalone parties of the political centre" column includes some single-interest parties that claim to draw support from all across the spectrum.
 † indicates the party has observer or associate status within transnational organization
 National parties are sorted by the alignment adopted by the party's leadership; in some cases MEPs have chosen to sit in different groups within the EP.
 The pan-European party Volt Europa is not shown in this table as it has national sections in several European countries; it is currently part of the Greens-European Free Alliance group in the European Parliament.

See also

 European integration
 Politics of Europe

References

External links
Parties and Elections in Europe - Political Parties &  International Party Organisations
European Parliament - Directory of MEPs by country and political group
Council of Europe Parliamentary Assembly - National Delegations
EPP - Parties and Partners
PES - Member Parties
ALDE - Member Parties
EGP - Member Parties
AECR - Member Parties
EL - Member Parties
MELD - Member Parties
EDP
EFA - Member Parties
EAF
AENM - Member Parties
EUD - Members
ECPM - Member Parties
NGLA - Members

Political parties in Europe
 
Organizational structure of political parties

ru:Европейские политические партии